Notocidaris is a genus of echinoderms belonging to the family Ctenocidaridae.

The species of this genus are found in the coasts of Antarctica and Southern Australia.

Species:

Notocidaris bakeri 
Notocidaris gaussensis 
Notocidaris hastata 
Notocidaris lanceolata 
Notocidaris mortenseni 
Notocidaris platyacantha 
Notocidaris remigera 
Notocidaris vellai

References

Ctenocidaridae
Cidaroida genera